SC Idar-Oberstein is a German association football club from the town of Idar-Oberstein, Rhineland-Palatinate. The club was created in 1971 out of the merger of 1. FC Idar, established 1 January 1907 as SC Alemannia Idar, and Sportvereinigung Idar, formed in 1908. The club currently has departments for football, athletics, and women's gymnastics, as well as youth football and recreational sport.



History
The first football club organized in the Nahe region, 1. FC Idar was a moderately successful amateur side in the years leading up to and following World War II, playing in the highest level regional amateur league through the 20s and into the early 30s, the Kreisliga Saar, later the Bezirksliga Rhein-Saar, and then, for a season, the Gauliga Mittelrhein. In 1938 a trio of FC players joined Hannover 96 and helped that club win the national championship. Following the war FC joined the 2nd Oberliga Südwest (II) where they competed briefly until being sent down in 1954. SpVgg Idar remained a lower tier local club during this time.

Despite the 1971 merger, newly formed SC performed poorly through the rest of the decade and on into the late 80s. An effort by a group of former players revitalized the club and a series of division championships led Idar out of the Bezirksliga Nahe (VII), through the Landesliga Südwest-West (VI) and Verbandsliga Südwest (V), and on to the Oberliga Südwest (IV). The team captured the SWFV-Pokal (Southwest Cup) in 1998, and in 1999 made its first appearance in DFB-Pokal (German Cup) play. They also won their way to the third division Regionalliga West/Südwest that year, but were overmatched and quickly relegated, dropping as far down as the Verbandsliga Südwest again by 2005. The team recovered and climbed the ranks again after this low point and, for the 2011–12 season, the club moved to the Regionalliga West where it stayed until 2012 when it became part of the new Regionalliga Südwest. The club lasted for only one season at this level before being relegated back to the Oberliga, now the Oberliga Rheinland-Pfalz/Saar. After two seasons at Oberliga level the club suffered another relegation in 2015, now to the Verbandsliga.

Honours
The club's honours:

League
 Oberliga Südwest (IV-V)
 Champions: 1999, 2011
 Verbandsliga Südwest (V)
 Champions: 1995, 2007
 Landesliga Südwest-West (VI)
 Champions: 1994
 Bezirksliga Nahe (VII)
 Champions: 1992

Cup
 South West Cup
 Winners: 1998

Recent managers
Recent managers of the club:

Recent seasons
The recent season-by-season performance of the club:

With the introduction of the Regionalligas in 1994 and the 3. Liga in 2008 as the new third tier, below the 2. Bundesliga, all leagues below dropped one tier. In 2012 the Oberliga Südwest was renamed Oberliga Rheinland-Pfalz/Saar.

Stadium
Since 1990 SC Idar-Oberstein has played at the Sportgelände Im Haag (capacity 6,000, 400 seats) where they have enjoyed good fan support throughout their years in the Oberliga.

Current squad

References

Grüne, Hardy (2001). Vereinslexikon. Kassel: AGON Sportverlag

External links
 Official team site
 Abseits Guide to German Soccer
 SC Idar-Oberstein at Weltfussball.de
 Das deutsche Fußball-Archiv historical German domestic league tables 

Football clubs in Germany
Football clubs in Rhineland-Palatinate
Association football clubs established in 1907
1907 establishments in Germany